Institut d'études politiques de Saint-Germain-en-Laye or Sciences Po Saint-Germain, is a French political science grande école situated on Saint-Germain-en-Laye, close to Paris and is attached to the Versailles Saint-Quentin-en-Yvelines University and the Cergy-Pontoise University. It was established in 2013. Sciences Po Saint-Germain-en-Laye is one of the ten Instituts d'études politiques of France, and a so-called "Grande Ecole".

The Institute has approximately 300 students, admitted after a rigorous selection. Academic studies last five years, at the end of which a student graduates with the Diploma of Sciences Po Saint-Germain-en-Laye (which is equivalent to a master's degree).

Sciences Po Saint-Germain specializes in political sciences. Therefore, the institute offers courses in economics and business, history, law, international relations, social sciences as well as in digital studies.

Location

Sciences Po Saint-Germain-en-Laye is located in a site built at the beginning of the 20th century which, in 1913, hosted the first teacher’s college of the Academy of Versailles. Today classified as historical monuments, the buildings are distributed around a closed landscaped garden conducive to serenity.

Sciences Po Saint-Germain-en-Laye, as the other Institutes of Political Studies in France, is one of the most selective French schools. Students wishing to attend Sciences Po Saint-Germain have to pass highly selective and competitive entrance exams composed of a general knowledge test, a history test, and a language test. Thoses exams are co-organized with six other institutes, respectively in Aix-en-Provence, Lille, Rennes, Lyon, Strasbourg, and Toulouse. Selected students can then decide in which of these seven institutes they will enrol. The selection rates are inferior than 10% since its creation in 2013 (110 places for the first year and 30 places for the fourth).

Overview

Sciences Po institutes are Grandes Écoles, a French institution of higher education that is separate from, but parallel and connected to the main framework of the French public university system. Similar to the Ivy League in the United States, Oxbridge in the UK, and C9 League in China, Grandes Écoles are elite academic institutions that admit students through an extremely competitive process. The selection rates at these schools are frequently less than 10%. Alums go on to occupy elite positions within government, administration, and corporate firms in France.

Although these institutes are more expensive than public universities in France, Grandes Écoles typically have much smaller class sizes and student bodies, and many of their programs are taught in English. International internships, study abroad opportunities, and close ties with government and the corporate world are a hallmark of the Grandes Écoles. Many of the top ranked schools in Europe are members of the Conférence des Grandes Écoles (CGE), as are the Sciences Po institutes.

The institute is modeled on the former École Libre des Sciences Politiques, and as such, Sciences Po specializes in political science, but uses an interdisciplinary approach to education that provides student generalists with the high level of grounding in skills that they need in History, Law, Economic Sciences, Sociology, Political science and International relations. The academic course lasts five years, and it is a three-year undergraduate programme and a two-year graduate programme and the primary diploma is a master's degree. The third year of the curriculum is a year of mobility abroad, and students can spend two semesters in a foreign university, one semester in a university and one semester internship or they also have the opportunity to spend two semesters as a trainee. Years 4 and 5 are for specialization. Degrees from Sciences Po are accredited by the Conférence des Grandes Écoles and awarded by the Ministry of National Education (France).

History

Directors
 Since 2013 : Céline Braconnier

References

External links
 Official site

Educational institutions established in 2013
Saint-Germain-en-Laye
Education in Île-de-France
2013 establishments in France